Liga Deportiva Universitaria de Quito's 1976 season was the club's 46th year of existence, the 23rd year in professional football and the 16th in the top level of professional football in Ecuador.

Squad

Competitions

Serie A

First stage

Results

Second stage

Results

Liguilla Final

Note: Includes bonus points earned in previous stages: El Nacional (6); D. Cuenca, Emelec & LDU Quito (2).

Results

Copa Libertadores

First stage

1st Place Playoff

Semi-finals

References
RSSSF - 1976 Serie A 
RSSSF - 1976 Copa Libertadores

External links
Official Site 
Copa Libertadores: LDU Quito (4) - Guabirá (0) 1st goal
Copa Libertadores: LDU Quito (4) - Guabirá (0) 2nd goal
Copa Libertadores: LDU Quito (4) - Guabirá (0) 3rd goal
Copa Libertadores: LDU Quito (4) - Guabirá (0) 4th goal

1976